Chicken karahi (known as gosht karahi when prepared with goat or lamb meat instead of chicken), or kadai chicken, is a chicken dish from South Asia.

It is noted for its spicy taste and is notable in Pakistani and North Indian cuisine. The dish is prepared in a karahi (a type of wok) and can take between 30 and 50 minutes  to prepare and cook the dish. Cumin, green chilis, ginger, garlic, tomatoes and coriander are key to the flavor of the dish. It is usually served with naan, roti or rice. This dish is one of the hallmarks of Indian and Pakistani cuisine.

References 

Pakistani cuisine
Indian cuisine
Indian chicken dishes
Spicy foods